The High Commissioner from New Zealand to Singapore is New Zealand's foremost diplomatic representative in the Republic of Singapore, and in charge of New Zealand's diplomatic mission in Singapore.

The High Commission is located on Orchard Road, in the heart of Singapore's Central Area.  New Zealand has maintained a resident High Commissioner in Singapore since Singapore's independence in 1965, and a resident Head of Mission since 1955.  The High Commissioner to Singapore is concurrently accredited to the Maldives.

As fellow members of the Commonwealth of Nations, diplomatic relations between New Zealand and Singapore are at governmental level, rather than between Heads of State.  Thus, the countries exchange High Commissioners, rather than ambassadors.

Between 1963 and 1965, Singapore was a member state of Malaysia.  During that period, the diplomatic mission to Singapore was subsumed by the greater mission to Malaysia; the High Commissioner to Malaysia was Hunter Wade. However, New Zealand maintained its Commission in Singapore, under the supervision of a Deputy High Commissioner, Brian Lendrum.

List of heads of mission

Commissioners to Singapore
Singapore as a British Colony (until 1963)
 Foss Shanahan (1955 – Jul 1958) Commissioner
 Brian Lendrum (Jul 1958 - Dec 1958) acting Commissioner
 Reuel Lochore (Jan. 1959 - Jul 1959) acting Commissioner
 Dick Hutchens (1959–1962) Commissioner
 Hunter Wade (1962–1963) Commissioner
 Bill Challis (1963) Commissioner

Deputy High Commissioner to Singapore
Singapore as a member state of Malaysia (1963–1965)
 Brian Lendrum (1963–1965)

High Commissioners to Singapore
Singapore as an independent state (since 1965)
 Brian Lendrum (1965–1966)
 Jim Weir (1966–1970)
 Tim Francis (1970–1974)
 Roger Peren (1974–1976)
 Gerald Hensley (1976–1980)
 Ken Cunningham (1980–1982)
 Judith Trotter (1982–1985)
 Tim Hannah (1985–1987)
 Don Harper (1987–1990)
 Colin Bell (1990–1995)
 Geoff Ward (1995–1998)
 David Kersey (1998–2001)
 NigeI Moore (2001–2004)
 Richard Grant (2004 – )
 Martin Harvey (2008 - 2010)
 Peter Hamilton (2010 - )
 HE Dr Jonathan Austin (2016 - )

References
 Heads of Missions List: S.  New Zealand Ministry of Foreign Affairs and Trade.  Retrieved on 2006-07-08.

Singapore, High Commissioners from New Zealand to
 
New Zealand